Lucas van Uffelen or Uffel (1586 – 1637) was a Dutch merchant and art collector.

Uffelen was born in Amsterdam, but moved to Venice where he grew his art collection. When he returned to Amsterdam in 1630, he continued to collect art. When he died, many of his Italian paintings were purchased by the Reynst Collection. He had his portrait painted by Anthony van Dyck twice, once in 1622 and later in the fashionable "action" style of getting up from one's chair. He appears to be getting up to greet the viewer after studying the objects of his collection.

Notable works from his collection
 Portrait of Andrea Odoni
 A Man with a Quilted Sleeve
 Portrait of Baldassare Castiglione

References

 E.H. van den Berghe, Italiaanse schilderijen in Amsterdam in de zeventiende eeuw, Jaarboek Amstelodamum 84 (1992), p. 21-40

1586 births
1637 deaths
Art collectors from Amsterdam
Businesspeople from the Dutch Republic